Proeulia chancoana is a species of moth of the family Tortricidae. It is found in the Maule Region of Chile.

The wingspan is 17 mm. The ground colour of the forewings is ferruginous cream with indistinct more ferruginous reticulation (a net-like pattern) and strigulation (fine streaks). The hindwings are greyish brown, but paler basally, with traces of dark reticulation.

Etymology
The species name refers to the type locality.

References

Moths described in 2010
Proeulia
Moths of South America
Taxa named by Józef Razowski
Endemic fauna of Chile